Hans Nikles was a Swiss footballer who played one season for FC Basel. He played as goalkeeper.

Nikes joined Basel's first team in for their 1930–31 season. He played his domestic league debut for the club in the away game on 14 September 1930 as Basel won 3–0 against Young Boys.

In that season Nikes played a total of 23 games for Basel. 17 of these games were in the Swiss Serie A, one in the Swiss Cup and five were friendly games. He held a clean sheet in four of his 17 domestic league games.

References

Sources
 Rotblau: Jahrbuch Saison 2017/2018. Publisher: FC Basel Marketing AG. 
 Die ersten 125 Jahre. Publisher: Josef Zindel im Friedrich Reinhardt Verlag, Basel. 
 Verein "Basler Fussballarchiv" Homepage

FC Basel players
Swiss men's footballers
Association football goalkeepers
Year of birth missing
Year of death missing